The New York race riots of 1919 developed with increasing racial tension and violent incidents in New York City. These riots were a part of the Red Summer, a series of violent terrorist attacks on black communities in many cities in the United States during the summer and early autumn of 1919. The New York race riots were caused by social tensions such as competition for jobs, politics, and racial tension. Many historians and scholars view these riots as the culmination of racial tensions which had been rising due to the migration of African Americans from the rural South to northern cities. Tensions developed partly due to the competition for jobs, which was worsened by the presence of African Americans workers who could replace striking White workers.

Background
Race tensions in New York had always been an issue. During the New York City draft riots of July 13–16, 1863, which were initially intended to express anger at the draft, the protests turned into a race riot, with White rioters, predominantly Irish immigrants, attacking African American people throughout the city. The official death toll was listed at 119 or 120 individuals. As more and more African-Americans moved from the south to the industrial north, they started to move into predominantly White neighborhoods.

July

On July 20, 1919, a White man and an African American man were arguing about World War I. The fight got heated and the black man pulled a gun and shot wildly down the street. Some of the bullets hit civilians, with one striking George Doles of 231 East 127th St while he was in his ground-floor apartment. Another hit Henrietta Taylor, who was sitting on a stoop on 228 East 127th Street. While the two were rushed to a Harlem hospital, word spread that a riot was about to start, and when police arrived on the scene about a thousand black people were present on the block between 2nd and 3rd Ave. As police attempted to clear the streets they were fired upon from surrounding buildings.

On July 31, the Syracuse riot broke out upstate in Syracuse, New York.

August
The Haynes' report, as summarized in the New York Times, lists a race riot as taking place on August 21.

September
In September there was another race riot.

Red Summer

This uprising was one of several incidents of civil unrest that began in the so-called American Red Summer of 1919. It consisted of terrorist attacks on black communities and white oppression in over three dozen cities and counties. In most cases, white mobs attacked African American neighborhoods. In some cases, black community groups resisted the attacks, especially in Chicago and Washington, D.C. Most deaths occurred in rural areas during events like the Elaine Race Riot in Arkansas, where an estimated 100 to 240 black people and 5 white people were killed. Also occurring in 1919 were the Chicago race riot and Washington D.C. race riot, which killed 38 and 39 people, respectively, and with both having many more non-fatal injuries and millions of dollars in property damage.

See also

Mass racial violence in the United States
List of incidents of civil unrest in New York City
List of incidents of civil unrest in the United States

Bibliography
Notes

References
 - Total pages: 752 

 - Total pages: 930 
 - Total pages: 234  

1919 in New York City
1919 in military history
1919 riots in the United States
July 1919 events
September 1919 events
African-American history between emancipation and the civil rights movement
History of racism in New York (state)
Racially motivated violence against African Americans
Red Summer
Riots and civil disorder in New York City
White American riots in the United States